A tantrum, temper tantrum, lash out, meltdown, fit or hissy fit is an emotional outburst, usually associated with those in emotional distress, that is typically characterized by stubbornness, crying, screaming, violence, defiance, angry ranting, a resistance to attempts at pacification, and, in some cases, hitting and other physically violent behavior. Physical control may be lost; the person may be unable to remain still; and even if the "goal" of the person is met, they may not be calmed. Throwing a temper tantrum can lead to a child getting detention or being suspended from school for older school age children.
A tantrum may be expressed in a tirade: a protracted, angry speech.

In early childhood
Tantrums are one of the most common forms of problematic behavior in young children but tend to decrease in frequency and intensity as the child gets  older. For a toddler, tantrums can be considered as normal, and even as gauges of developing strength of character.

While tantrums are sometimes seen as a predictor of future anti-social behaviour, in another sense they are simply an age-appropriate sign of excessive frustration, and will diminish over time given a calm and consistent handling. Parental containment where a child cannot contain themself—rather than what the child is ostensibly demanding—may be what is really required.

Selma Fraiberg warned against "too much pressure or forceful methods of control from the outside" in child-rearing: "if we turn every instance of pants changing, treasure hunting, napping, puddle wading and garbage distribution into a governmental crisis we can easily bring on fierce defiance, tantrums, and all the fireworks of revolt in the nursery".

Intellectual and developmental disorders 
Some people who have developmental disorders such as autism, Asperger syndrome, ADHD, and intellectual disability could be more vulnerable to tantrums than others, although anyone experiencing brain damage (temporary or permanent) can suffer from tantrums. Anyone may be prone to tantrums once in a while, regardless of gender or age. However, a meltdown due to sensory overload (which even neurotypical children can experience) is not the same as a temper tantrum.

Aberrations

Freud considered that the Wolf Man's development of temper tantrums was connected with his seduction by his sister: he became "discontented, irritable and violent, took offence on every possible occasion, and then flew into a rage and screamed like a savage". Freud linked the tantrums to an unconscious need for punishment driven by feelings of guilt—something which he thought could be generalised to many other cases of childhood tantrums.

Heinz Kohut contended that tantrums were rages of anger, caused by the thwarting of the infant's grandiose-exhibitionist core. The blow to the inflated self-image, when a child's wishes are (however justifiably) refused, creates fury because it strikes at the feeling of omnipotence.

Jealousy over the birth of a sibling, and resulting aggression, may also provoke negativistic tantrums, as the effort at controlling the feelings overloads the child's system of self-regulation.

In later life
Writer William Makepeace Thackeray claimed that in later life "you may tell a tantrum as far as you can see one, by the distressed and dissatisfied expression of its countenance—'Tantrumical', if we may term it so".

Heinz Kohut contended that "the baby’s core is likely to contain a self-centred, grandiose-exhibitionist part", and that "tantrums at being frustrated thus represent narcissistic rages" at the blow to the inflated self-image. With "a child confronted with some refusal ... regardless of its justifications, the refusal automatically provokes fury, since it offends his sense of omnipotence".

The willingness of the celebrity to throw tantrums whenever thwarted to the least degree is a kind of acquired situational narcissism or tantrumical behavior.

If tantrums are shown by older people, they might often be signs of immaturity or a mental disability; and often autistic or ADHD meltdowns are incorrectly labelled tantrums. It can also occur in neurotypical people under extreme stress.

See also
 Acting out
 Running amok
 Philippic (tirade, orations)

References

External links 
 

Aggression
Childhood
Emotion
Habits
Narcissism
Parenting
Problem behavior
Violence
Articles containing video clips